Stephen Henry Braybrooke (24 December 1808 – 1886) was an English first-class cricketer.

Born at Thanet in December 1808, Braybrooke was by profession a mill owner at Oldham, specialising in the spinning and manufacture of cotton. He played first-class cricket on two occasions for Manchester, with both matches coming against Yorkshire in 1844 and 1845 at Moss Lane. Braybrooke died at Salford in 1886.

References

External links

1808 births
1886 deaths
People from Thanet (district)
English cricketers
Manchester Cricket Club cricketers
English industrialists
19th-century English businesspeople